Elizabeth Hartley may refer to:

Elizabeth Hartley (actress) (1751–1824), English actress
Elizabeth Hartley (Girl Guides) (1906–1996), active in the Girl Guiding movement
 Elizabeth Hartley (archaeologist) (1947–2018), archaeologist and museum curator

See also
Elizabeth Hartley Winthrop (born 1979), born in New York City in 1979